Malda is a village in Audru Parish, Pärnu County, in southwestern Estonia. It is located just northwest of Audru, the administrative centre of the municipality. The city of Pärnu is located 12 km southeast. Malda has a population of 117 (as of 1 January 2011).

References

Villages in Pärnu County